Paracincia dognini is a moth of the subfamily Arctiinae. It was described by William D. Field in 1950. It is found on Jamaica.

References

Lithosiini